Henry Bishop may refer to:

Henry (bishop of Finland) (died 1156), English clergyman
Henry Bishop (composer) (1786–1855), English composer
Henry Bishop (cricketer) (1849–1891), Australian cricketer
Henry Bishop (postmaster general) (1605–1691/2), Postmaster General of England
Henry Bishop (priest) (c. 1800–1857), English priest and academic
Henry Alfred Bishop (1860–1934), superintendent and vice-president of several Eastern railroads
Henry W. Bishop (1829–1913), Massachusetts-born citizen of Chicago, Illinois

See also

Harry Bishop (disambiguation)